In Greek mythology, Pylus (Ancient Greek: Πύλος means "in the gateway") was a member of the Aetolian royal family.

Family 
Pylus was a son of Ares and princess Demonice, daughter of King Agenor of Pleuron. He was the brother of Evenus, Molus and Thestius.

Mythology 

Note

Reference 
Princes in Greek mythology
Children of Ares
Mortal parents of demigods in classical mythology
Aetolian characters in Greek mythology
 Apollodorus, The Library with an English Translation by Sir James George Frazer, F.B.A., F.R.S. in 2 Volumes, Cambridge, MA, Harvard University Press; London, William Heinemann Ltd. 1921. ISBN 0-674-99135-4. Online version at the Perseus Digital Library. Greek text available from the same website.